Pedro Towers (28 March 1921 – 23 August 1983) was an Argentine rower. He competed in the men's coxed pair event at the 1948 Summer Olympics.

References

External links
 

1921 births
1983 deaths
Argentine male rowers
Olympic rowers of Argentina
Rowers at the 1948 Summer Olympics
Rowers from Buenos Aires